The bun penny is a bronze pre-decimal penny (1d) which was issued by the Royal Mint from 1860 to 1894. The designs of both obverse and reverse are by Leonard Charles Wyon. It was the first type of bronze penny issued by the Royal Mint, the incipient issue of a series which was to last until decimalisation in 1971. The bun penny gets its name from Queen Victoria's hairstyle, which is gathered together in a 'bun'.

The bun penny was common in circulation in the United Kingdom until the 1960s, and numerous varieties are known, some of which are of exceptional rarity. The series is one of the most commonly collected in the numismatics of the UK.

History 
The Coinage Act 1859 extended the Coinage Offences Act 1832, so far as it related to the then current copper coinage, to cover any coinage of mixed metal issued in replacement of such copper coinage.

Design

Die varieties

Collecting

Mintages 

 1860 ~ 5,053,440
 1861 ~ 36,449,280
 1862 ~ 50,534,400
 1863 ~ 28,062,700
 1864 ~ 3,440,640
 1865 ~ 8,601,600
 1866 ~ 9,999,360
 1867 ~ 5,483,520
 1868 ~ 1,182,720
 1869 ~ 2,580,480
 1870 ~ 5,695,022
 1871 ~ 1,290,318
 1872 ~ 8,494,572
 1873 ~ 8,494,200
 1874 ~ 5,621,865
 1874H ~ 6,666,240 (Heaton Mint, Birmingham)
 1875 ~ 10,691,040
 1875H ~ 752,640 (Heaton Mint, Birmingham)
 1876H ~ 11,074,560 (Heaton Mint, Birmingham)
 1877 ~ 9,624,747
 1878 ~ 2,764,470
 1879 ~ 7,666,476
 1880 ~ 3,000,831
 1881 ~ 2,302,362
 1881H ~ 3,763,200 (Heaton Mint, Birmingham)
 1882H ~ 7,526,400 (Heaton Mint, Birmingham)
 1883 ~ 6,327,438
 1884 ~ 11,702,802
 1885 ~ 7,145,862
 1886 ~ 6,087,759
 1887 ~  5,315,085
 1888 ~ 5,125,020
 1889 ~ 12,559,737
 1890 ~ 15,330,840
 1891 ~ 17,885,961
 1892 ~ 10,501,671
 1893 ~ 8,161,737
 1894 ~ 3,883,452

References 

Coins of the United Kingdom